Michal Krajník (born 5 April 1988 in Snina), is a former Slovak football player who recently played for 1. FC Tatran Prešov.

References

External links
1. FC Tatran Prešov profile 

1988 births
Living people
Slovak footballers
Association football defenders
FK Slovan Duslo Šaľa players
1. FC Tatran Prešov players
Slovak Super Liga players
People from Snina
Sportspeople from the Prešov Region